The Trojan Horse is a 1961 Italian peplum film set in the tenth and final year of the Trojan War.  The film focuses primarily on the exploits of the Trojan hero Aeneas during this time.  The film was directed by Giorgio Ferroni and stars Steve Reeves as Aeneas and John Drew Barrymore as Odysseus.

In 2004 it was restored and shown as part of the retrospective "Storia Segreta del Cinema Italiano: Italian Kings of the Bs" at the 61st Venice International Film Festival.

Cast

Production
The battle scenes were shot in Yugoslavia.

Release
The Trojan Horse was released in Italy on 26 October 1961 with a 115-minute running time. It was released in July 1962 in the United States with a 105-minute running time.

See also
 List of historical drama films
 Greek mythology in popular culture
 Sword-and-sandal

Footnotes

References

External links
 
 The Trojan Horse at Variety Distribution

1961 films
1960s historical films
Peplum films
French historical drama films
Yugoslav historical drama films
Films directed by Giorgio Ferroni
Trojan War films
Films shot in Montenegro
Films shot in Yugoslavia
Siege films
Cultural depictions of Helen of Troy
Films scored by Giovanni Fusco
Sword and sandal films
Agamemnon
1960s Italian-language films
1960s Italian films